Southern Maryland Rapid Transit, abbreviated as SMRT, is a proposed mass transit line along the Maryland Route 5 and U.S. Route 301 highway corridors in between Washington, D.C. and Waldorf, Maryland. The project would link the heavily populated suburbs of northwestern Southern Maryland with Washington via a direct transit connection to the Washington Metro at Branch Avenue station.

Background
Plans have called for a mass transit line serving the MD 5-US 301 corridor since the 1990s. In 2004, the MD 5/US 301 Transit Service Staging Plan (TSSP) was created as a guide to mitigate transit expansion along the growing corridor. The Maryland State Senate issued Senate Bill 281 which required a light rail study be issued between Branch Avenue Metro Station and White Plains. This legislation was complemented by the 2010 Southern Maryland Corridor Transit Corridor Preservation Study, further detailing the planning process for such a transit connection. In May 2017, the SMRT Final Alternatives Report was released, recommending bus rapid transit and preferred alignment options. Local politicians are attempting to implement light rail over bus rapid transit, citing capacity concerns.

See also
Green Line - a proposed rail line in Baltimore from Johns Hopkins Hospital to Morgan State University.
Red Line - a proposed rail line from Woodlawn, in Baltimore County (west), to Johns Hopkins Bayview Medical Center in Baltimore City (east).
Charles Street Trolley - a proposed trolley line in northern Baltimore, backed by a non-MTA group.

References

External links
MTA Maryland
Map

Maryland Transit Administration
Proposed public transportation in Maryland